Otto-William (955/62 – 21 September 1026 AD) was count of Mâcon, Nevers, and Burgundy.

Life
Otto was born in 958 during the joint reign of his grandfather, King Berengar II of Italy, and his father, King Adalbert. His mother was Gerberga.

After Adalbert's death in 971/5, Gerberga married for a second time, to Henry I, Duke of Burgundy, the younger brother of King Hugh Capet. Gerberga and Henry had no children together. Since Henry had no legitimate son of his own, he adopted Otto-William making him a possible heir of the Duchy of Burgundy.

While the son of a king, Otto did not seek a royal wife. In , he married Ermentrude of Roucy, whose maternal grandmother, Gerberga of Saxony, was a sister of Otto I, Holy Roman Emperor, and by this marriage alliance created a web of consanguinity between later kings of France, Germany, Burgundy and the Carolingians. Even Otto's children's spouses, although from great families, came from widespread and scattered parts of France.

This marriage brought to Otto-William the County of Mâcon as well as many other rights on the left bank of the Saône in the province of Besançon. The new Count of Mâcon consolidated there his political grip making what would be later be the Free County of Burgundy around Dole.

From his mother Otto could inherited the County of Nevers before 990. However he left Nevers to his stepson Landric and rather claimed the County of Beaune in which the dowry of Gerberga was. 

The Duchy of Burgundy was eventually annexed to the crown of France by King Robert II, nephew of Henry I, Duke of Burgundy, in 1005.

On the left-bank of the Saône, determined to be sovereign ruler of his own lands, Otto revolted against the Emperor Henry II in 1016. This was after Rudolph III of Burgundy, the last king of Burgundy and Arles, had done homage to Henry at Strasbourg, making him his guard and heir. On Otto's death, the Free County fell under the suzerainty of the German emperors.

Otto died on 21 September 1026 at the age of 64 and was buried in St-Benigne of Dijon.

Marriage and issue

Otto's first wife was Ermentrude, daughter of Renaud of Roucy. They had:
 Guy (–1006) had been associated as count of Mâcon from 995. His wife is unknown.
 Matilda, married Landri of Nevers, Count of Nevers
 Gerberga, married Guilhem II of Provence
 Reginald I, Count of Burgundy (–1057), he married Adelaide (or Judith) of Normandy.
 Agnes, married firstly William V of Aquitaine, secondly Geoffrey II of Anjou.

Otto remarried late in life to a wife named Adelaide. Some scholars have identified her as the four-times widowed Adelaide-Blanche of Anjou, but the identity is not directly attested and has been disputed by some studying the question.

See also
Dukes of Burgundy family tree

References

Sources
 
101

External links
 Baldwin, Stewart, FASG, Adélaïde/Alix alias Blanche of Anjou, Henry Project

Anscarids
Dukes of Burgundy
Counts of Burgundy
Counts of Mâcon
10th-century births
1026 deaths
Year of birth uncertain
Sons of kings